Ninja Cadets, known in Japan as ,  is a two-episode original video animation (OVA) anime series produced by AIC and Youmex and created by Eiji Suganuma, who also directed, storyboarded it and designed the characters. It is a comedy about a group of ninja-in-training in feudal Japan.

Ninja Cadets was released in two episodes from March 27 to June 12, 1996. It has the distinction of being the first anime DVD ever released. The series is licensed in the United States by Media Blasters under its AnimeWorks label. It is the first English anime dub ever produced by Bang Zoom! Entertainment.

Voices

English
Sandy Fox as Sakura
Lia Sargent as Matsuri
Michelle Ruff as Yume
Mona Marshall as Pochi
Lex Lang as Hayashi, Matsuzaka
Jack Cox as Kaoru
Beth Wernick as Jame
Derek Stephen Prince as Nikko
Steve Kramer as Yukinobu, Tea House Master
Jeffrey Stackhouse as Lord Byakuro

References

External links

1996 anime OVAs
1996 Japanese novels
1996 manga
Anime International Company
Fujimi Fantasia Bunko
Ninja in anime and manga
Light novels